This is a list of  in Japan.

Background
Isonokami no Yakatsugu's Nara period  is held out to be Japan's first public library, but private libraries, such as Kanazawa Bunko, remained the norm until modern times. The Imperial Library, one of the predecessors to the National Diet Library, was established towards the end of the nineteenth century.

National library

Public libraries 
As of 2008, there were 3,106 public libraries in Japan: 1 regional library, 62 prefectural libraries, 2,433 city libraries, and 610 town libraries.

Prefectural libraries

Hokkaidō region

Tōhoku region

Kantō region

Chūbu region

Kinki region

Chūgoku region

Shikoku region

Kyūsyū region

Municipal libraries 

 Hakodate City Central Library

Special libraries 

1,761 institutions were listed in the 2009 Directory of Special Libraries in Japan.
 E.H. Norman Library, Embassy of Canada

University libraries 

In 2007, there were 758 four-year universities in Japan: 86 national, 77 public, 595 private.

Tama Art University Library
Sophia University Library (上智大学図書館, Jōchi Daigaku Toshokan)
Central Library (中央図書館, Chūō Toshokan)
Law School Library (法科大学院図書室, Hōka Daigakuin Toshoshitsu)
Mejiro Seibo Campus Library (目白聖母キャンパス図書館, Mejiro Seibo Kyanpasu Toshokan)

References 

 
Japan
Libraries
Japan education-related lists